Evenings at Home, or The Juvenile Budget Opened (1792–1796) is a collection of six volumes of stories written by John Aikin and his sister Anna Laetitia Barbauld.  It is an early example of children's literature.  The late Victorian children's writer Mary Louisa Molesworth named it as one of the handful of books that was owned by every family in her childhood and read enthusiastically. In their introduction, the authors explain the title in these words: 

The book was translated into French. W. S. Gilbert took the title for one of his plays, Eyes and No Eyes (1875), from one of the stories in the collection. Ichchharam Desai translated these stories in Gujarati as Balkono Anand (1895).

Further reading

Notes

References

 Carpenter, Humphrey and Mari Prichard. Oxford Companion to Children's Literature. Oxford University Press, 1997. 
 Zipes, Jack (ed) et al. The Norton Anthology of Children's Literature: The Traditions in English.  W. W. Norton, 2005. 
 Zipes, Jack (ed.). The Oxford Encyclopedia of Children's Literature. Volumes 1–4. Oxford University Press, 2006. 
 Watson, Victor, The Cambridge Guide to Children's Books in English. Cambridge University Press, 2001. 
 Demmers, Patricia (ed). From Instruction to Delight: An Anthology of Children's Literature to 1850, Oxford University Press, 2003.  Table of Contents. 384 pages. . 
 St. John, Judith. The Osborne Collection of Early Children's Books, 1566–1910, A Catalogue, Toronto Public Library.

External links

 British Library: Children's Literature
 Search publishing histories: Copac: Academic & National Library Catalogue at the University of Manchester.
 Another website: British Library: Integrated Catalogue.
 Search: Library of Congress Online Catalog
 Search: National Union Catalog of Manuscript Collections
 Course syllabus: Studies in Eighteenth century literature: Books for Children, at the University of Toronto.

Book series introduced in 1792
1790s children's books
18th-century British children's literature
Anna Laetitia Barbauld
Children's short story collections